Rupela albina is a moth of the family Crambidae. It is found in Mexico, Honduras, Guatemala, Nicaragua, Costa Rica, the Guianas, Brazil, Colombia, Ecuador and Peru.

The wingspan is 20–34 mm for males and 27–45 mm for females. The wings are white.

References

Moths described in 1781
Schoenobiinae